Ali Mohammadi (also Romanized as ʿAlī Moḩammadī; also known as Alīmoḩammadī) is a village in Baghak Rural District, in the Central District of Tangestan County, Bushehr Province, Iran. At the 2006 census, its population was 49, in 12 families.

References 

Populated places in Tangestan County